Huub Sijen (21 November 1918 – 20 February 1965) was a Dutch racing cyclist. He rode the Tour de France in 1939, 1947 and 1949.

References

External links

1918 births
1965 deaths
Dutch male cyclists
Sportspeople from Maastricht
Cyclists from Limburg (Netherlands)